Živan Vulić (Staro Laniste near Jagodina, Kingdom of Serbia, 1911 - Belgrade, Serbia, 2006) was a prominent and prolific Serbian painter of the 20th century. His works were sold in auction houses in Serbia
 and abroad.

He was born in 1911. in the village of Lanište near Jagodina, and since 1919. he lived in the capital, where he graduated from the teaching department of the State Art School in 1932, in the class of Beta Vukanović and Ljubomir Ivanović, his professors and mentors.

He was well appreciated by art critics and in art circles in Belgrade for his landscapes of Kalemegdan and the environs.

Known for its motifs from nature, urban depictions and rich colours. 

During his life, he was considered one of Serbia's oldest and most prominent painters.

At one point in his life, he worked as a drawing teacher at the Gymnasium in Čačak.

His oeuvre includes 2,500 works, mostly oils on canvas. He held more than 30 solo exhibitions. He left a legacy of 47 of his works to the Homeland Museum in Jagodina, as well as 30 works by Nikola Milojević, a well-known painter also from Jagodina.

See also 
 List of Serbian painters

Reference 
 Auction house Srbinovski,
 "The oldest Serbian painter Živan Vulić, news Tanjug, has passed away." Archived from the original on October 27, 2016. Retrieved August 28, 2016,
 "Art Gallery" Nadežda Petrović "Čačak". Archived from the original on October 30, 2016. Retrieved August 28, 2016.

External links 
 Gallery of antique shops "D & B"

References 

1911 births
2006 deaths